Enikő A. Sajti (born 13 September 1944) is a Hungarian historian and professor emerita of Faculty of Arts, University of Szeged. She has been active in research of the relationship between Serbia & Croatia (Yugoslavia) and Hungary for decades. She is a notable and respected scientist both in Hungary and around the world.

Biography and carrier
She took M. A. degree in Russian philology and history at the Attila József University (JATE), Szeged, Faculty of Arts in 1967.

She began her career as a high school teacher. In 1973 she started as a research fellow of the Department of Modern History at the Faculty of Arts, JATE, and later she became an associate professor (docent, reader). She was appointed to the head of the department, and she acted as a head from 1985 until 1995. She was the deputy dean in charge of education at the Faculty of Arts, JATE from 1991 until 1994. She took candidate (C.Sc.) of history degree in 1984 and was awarded Doctor of Science (D.Sc.) degree in history in 2003. In 1998 she habilitated. In 1999 she was appointed to university (full) professor of the Department of Modern History and Mediterranean Studies. From 2001 until 2014 she acted as a subprogram leader of modern history in the Doctoral School of History at the University of Szeged, and she was a member of the Council of the Doctoral School of History and a VIP member of the doctoral school. She was an invited lecturer of the Interdisciplinary Doctoral School at the Faculty of Arts at the University of Pécs. In 2014 the honorific title of professor emerita was conferred upon her.
She has done research abroad, in Belgrade, Zagreb and Novi Sad for several times.

She presents her talks at several conferences and at the different science forums and she developed significant research and professional relationships.

Her working papers were issued in both national and international prestigious professional research scientific journals, and 12 monographs and 150 scientific articles were published.

Committee memberships
Attila József University (JATE), Scientific Committee of the Faculty of Arts, secretary (1984–1987)
JATE, Faculty of Arts, Department of Modern History, head (1985–1995)
JATE, Scientific Committee of the Faculty of Arts, deputy chairperson (1987–1988)
JATE, Rehabilitation Committee, member (1990–1991) 
JATE, Faculty of Arts, Deputy dean for Education (1991–1994) 
University of Szeged (SZTE), Faculty of Arts, Council of the Doctoral School of History, member (2005–2014)
Hungarian Society for Dissemination of Scientific Knowledge (TIT) in Csongrád County, deputy chairperson (1988–1993)
Hungarian Academy of Sciences (HAS), Eastern European Complex Committee, member (1985–1991)
HAS, member of the Public Body 
Hungarian Historical Society, Board of Directors, member, deputy chairperson
Századok (Periodical of the Hungarian Historical Society), Member of the Scientific Redaction
Múltunk (Our Past - Journal on political history) – Advisory Board, member
Council of the Regional Centre of the Hungarian Academy of Sciences (SZAB), member, History Commission (Szeged)

Awards and honors
Széchenyi Professor Scholarship (Ministry of Education of Hungary) (1998–2001)
Albert Szent-Györgyi Award (Ministry of Education of Hungary), 2008
Teacher's Service Medal (Pedagógus Szolgálati Emlékérem) (Ministry of Human Capacities of Hungary), 2013 
Délvidék Kutatásáért Emlékérem (Medal for Research in the Southern Province) (Délvidék Kutatóközpont; Research Center for the Southern Province), 2015
Gold Diploma (SZTE, 2017)

Selected works

Papers
Útkeresés. A Jugoszláv Kommunista Párt nemzetiségpolitikai koncepciójának formálódása az 1920-as években. Századok, 1979/3. 376–420. 
Ismeretlen dokumentum az 1942 januári délvidéki razzia résztvevőinek peréről. (Co-author György Markó), Hadtörténelmi Közlemények, 1985. 2.sz. XXXII. 426–456. 
Territoriale Revision und die Nationalitatenverhaltnisse. Ethnicity and Society in Hungary. Ferenc Glatz (ed.): Etudes Historiques Hongroises 1990 publiées á loccassion du XVII e Congrés International des Sciences Historiques par le Comité National des Historiens Hongrois. Budapest, 1990. 393–406. 
A háború elõtti évek. Lajos Serfõzõ (ed.): Szeged története. 4. 1919–1944. Serial editor Gyula Kristó. Szeged, 1994. 447–472. 
Changes in the Situation of the Hungarian Minority in Yugoslavia during the Period of Royal Dictatorship (1929–1941)  Chronica. Annual of the Institut of History University of Szeged. 2001. Volume 1. 128–152.
Az impériumváltás hatása a délvidéki magyarok társadalomszerkezetére. Limes, 2002. 2. sz. 41–50. 
Impériumváltás, magyarellenes megtorlások, kitelepítések és a konszolidáció feltételeinek kialakulása a Délvidéken 1944–1947. Századok, 2002., 136. évf., 5.sz. 1061–1114.
The former ‘Southlands’ in Serbia: 1918–1947. The Hungarian Quarterly. Volume 47. No. 181. Spring 2006. 111–124.
Ötvenhatos menekültek Jugoszláviában. A magyar-jugoszláv hazatelepítési bizottságok tevékenysége 1956–1957-ben. In.: Az 1956-os forradalom visszhangja a szovjet tömb országaiban. Évkönyv, XIV. 2006–2007. Budapest, 1956-os Intézet. 2007. 201–212.
A „kommunizmus mostohagyermekei”: a magyar kisebbség elleni megtorlások a Délvidéken (a Vajdaságban) – a kutatás eredményei és kérdőjelei. Létünk. Társadalom, tudomány, kultúra. Forum Könyvkiadó, Újvidék, XXXVIII.évfolyam, 20008. 3. szám. 28–42. 
Egy kommunista káder a külügyben 1945–1948: Rex József. Forrás, 41. évf, 2009. 7–8. szám. 89–109.
„Én ezeket magamtól meg sem írtam volna...” Katolikus egyházi források a magyarok elleni partizánmegtorlásokról a Bácskában.  In: Gecsényi, Lajos – Izsák, Lajos (eds.): Magyar történettudmány az ezredfordulón. Glatz Ferenc 70. születésnapjára. ELTE Eötvös Kiadó – MTA Társadalomkutató Központ, Budapest, 2011. 567–575.
Háború, kisebbségpolitika, megtorlás: magyarok és szerbek 1941–1945. Élet és Irodalom, 2011. year 55, No. 36 3–4., 12. o.
A magyar vagyonok kisajátítása, államosítása Jugoszláviában 1945 után. Eksproprijacija i nacionalizacija mađarske svojine u Jugoslaviji nakon 1945. In.: A. Sajti, Enikő – Juhász, József – Molnár, Tibor (eds.): A titói rendszer megszilárdulása a Tisza mentén (1945–1955). Konsolidacija Titovog režima na Potisju (1945–1955) = Hajnal, Jenő (eds.): A titói jugoszlávia levéltári forrásai 4. Arhivski izvori titove Jugoslavije 4. Zentai Történelmi Levéltár, Magyar Nemzeti Levéltár Csongrád Megyei Levéltára, Zenta=Senta, Szeged=Segedin, 2013.. 133–159., 327–354. 
„A nemzeti lelkiismeret őrállója”. Cseres Tibor: Hideg napok és a „még hidegebb napok”. Forrás, year 47. 2015. No. 4. 97–106.
„A mai napon megszűnt a szabadság szeplőtlen fogantatása.” Várady Imre hétköznapjai a Bánátban 1941–1945. In: Gyarmati, György – Pihurik, Judit (eds.): Háborús hétköznapok hadszíntéren, hátországban 1939–1945., Magyar Történelmi Társulat, Kronosz Kiadó, Állambiztonsági Szolgálatok Történeti Levéltára, Budapest–Pécs, 2015. 77–89.
Svest o krivici i nadmoć pobednika: Mađarska i Jugoslavija 1945–1947. u svetlu mađarskih dokumenata. In: Зоран Јањетовић (ed-in-chief): 1945. крај или нови почетак? / [главни и одговорни уредник Зоран Јањетовић] / – Београд : Институт за новију историју Србије : Музеј жртава геноцида, 2016. – (Библиотека Зборници радова ; бр. 13). Str. 531–555.

Books
Székely telepítés és nemzetiségpolitika a Bácskában – 1941. = Nemzetiségi füzetek 6., Akadémiai Kiadó, Budapest, 1984.
Délvidék 1941–1944. A magyar kormányok délszláv politikája. Kossuth Kiadó, Budapest, 1987. 
Josip Broz Tito. (Polonyi Péter: Mao Ce-tung) Fekete-fehér. Pannonica Kiadó, 2000, 163–307. pp. 
Hungarians in the Voivodina 1918–1947 = Atlantic Studies on Society in Change No. 110. Highland Lakes, New Jersey, 2003. (ford.: Brian Mc Lean) 
Impériumváltások, revízió, kisebbség. Magyarok a Délvidéken 1918–1947. Napvilág Kiadó, Budapest, 2004. 
Bűntudat és győztes fölény. Magyarország, Jugoszlávia és a délvidéki magyarok. Szeged, 2010. 
Mađari u Vojvodini 1918–1947. Izdavački zavod Forum, Novi Sad, 2010. 
Kisebbségpolitika és társadalomszervezés. Várady Imre (1867–1959) bánáti magyar politikus iratai. Forum Könyvkiadó, 2016.

References

Bibliography

External links 

 
 

1944 births
Hungarian women historians
Living people
People from Salonta
20th-century Hungarian historians
21st-century Hungarian historians
Academic staff of the University of Szeged